THSU or Thsu may refer to:
 
 Texas Health and Science University - Traditional Chinese Medicine school in Austin, TX
 Tower Hamlets Summer University - Charity organization that now goes by the name: Futureversity